SDZ SER-082 is a drug which acts as a mixed antagonist for the 5-HT2B and 5-HT2C serotonin receptors, with good selectivity over other serotonin receptor subtypes and slight preference for 5-HT2C over 5-HT2B. It has been used in animal studies into the behavioural effects of the different 5-HT2 subtypes, and how they influence the effects of other drugs such as cocaine.

References 

5-HT2 antagonists
Indolonaphthyridines